PNC Center is a high-rise located in downtown Fort Lauderdale, Florida. The building opened in 1991, as First Union Center and later renamed Wachovia Center, after Wachovia became the building's largest tenant.

References

External links

Skyscrapers in Fort Lauderdale, Florida
1991 establishments in Florida
Skyscraper office buildings in Florida
Office buildings completed in 1991
RTKL Associates buildings